{{Infobox American football team
| name = Bydgoszcz Archers
| helmet = 
| logo = 
| uniform =
| founded = 2009
| suspended = 
| folded = 2021
| location = Bydgoszcz, Poland
| field =  Stadion KKP Bydgoszcz
| league = Polish Football League
| division = 
| colours = Green and Yellow   
| nickname = pl. "Łucznicy"
| coach = Daniel Piechnik 
| manager = Izabela Kalinowska 
| owner = 
| league_champ_type = Polish Bowl
| league_champs = 1 (2021)
| mascot = 
| website = bydgoszczarchers.com
}}
The Bydgoszcz Archers were a one-time Polish champion American football team based in Bydgoszcz, Poland which currently competes in the Polish Football League.

History
The origins of American football in Bydgoszcz back to 2008, when it began to create a team called Bydgoszcz Raiders. In 2009 the team changed his name to Bydgoszcz Archers. The name refers to one of the symbols of Bydgoszcz, sculpture of the Łuczniczka (female archer). In the 2011 season the team took 4th place in the 8-man football competition PLFA 8''. Archers qualified for the Final Four, after winning the qualifying tournament in Bydgoszcz and finishing second in the tournament in Olsztyn. After the 2019 season the Archers merged with the team "Herosi Bydgoszcz" and joined the new Liga Futbolu Amerykańskiego.

Season-by-season records

References

External links
 Official website

American football teams in Poland
Sport in Bydgoszcz
2009 establishments in Poland
2021 disestablishments in Poland
American football teams established in 2009